is a 1978 Japanese animated anthology film that premiered in Albuquerque, New Mexico on November 2, 1978. It was released by Sanrio in the United States on May 3, 1979. It is a retelling of stories from Metamorphoses by the Roman poet Ovid, and narration by Peter Ustinov. In all of its five parts, the protagonists are portrayed in the form of a recurring boy and girl.

Production

The film was the between American golden age of Disney-influenced anime and Sanrio's second animated release in the US (following their adaptation of The Mouse and His Child the previous year). Over 170 animators, all employed in Hollywood, worked on it for three years.

Release

Metamorphoses tried to be the rock era's answer to Fantasia, but its original run was critically reviled and closed as soon as it opened. According to many of its crew, many problems with the production, music and plotting were to blame.

On May 3, 1979, it was reissued under a new title, Winds of Change, with seven minutes trimmed from the first cut of 89 minutes. This time, the music was composed by Alec R. Costandinos, the disco songs were sung by Arthur Simms and Pattie Brooks and narration by Peter Ustinov was added.

The five parts:
 "Actaeon"
 "Orpheus and Eurydice"
 "The House of Envy"
 "Perseus" and... 
 "Phaëton"

...in the original order, were re-arranged and slightly renamed for the new version; the third and last parts remained unmoved. In the Winds cut, the first two were now "Perseus" and "Actaeon", and the fourth "Orpheus".

In addition, the boy was now called Wondermaker, and the girl played different characters in every segment. Greek gods Hermes, Artemis and Hades were given their Roman names (Mercury, Diana and Pluto respectively).

See also
Cultural influence of Metamorphoses
List of animated feature-length films

Sources
Beck, Jerry (2005), pp. 166–7. The Animated Movie Guide. . Chicago Reader Press. Accessed April 9, 2007.

References

External links
 (under later title, Winds of Change)
 

1970s musical fantasy films
1979 anime films
1979 films
Animated drama films
Animated musical films
Japanese anthology films
Animated films based on classical mythology
Films based on Metamorphoses
Films set in ancient Greece
Films set in classical antiquity
Films with live action and animation
Japanese independent films
Japanese epic films
Japanese animated fantasy films
Japanese musical fantasy films
Japanese rock music films
Films about shapeshifting
Films scored by Billy Goldenberg
Sanrio
1970s English-language films
Classical mythology in anime and manga